Evergreen Cemetery, located at William and University Streets in Fayetteville, Arkansas, is one of the largest early historic cemeteries in the region, with burials dating to 1838.  Evergreen is included in the National Register of Historic Places for its age, and because numerous important historical figures are buried there.  These include Senator J. William Fulbright, Governor Archibald Yell, educator Sophia Sawyer, industrialist Lafayette Gregg, and many others.

The cemetery was founded as a private cemetery by John Thomas in the late 1830s or early 1840s.  Later it was owned by the local Masonic Lodge and Independent Order of Odd Fellows chapter.  These organizations deeded the cemetery to the city in 1871.  It is currently owned and operated by the Fayetteville Evergreen Cemetery Association.

See also
 National Register of Historic Places listings in Washington County, Arkansas

Notes

External links
 Evergreen Cemetery web site
 

Cemeteries on the National Register of Historic Places in Arkansas
Protected areas of Washington County, Arkansas
Tourist attractions in Fayetteville, Arkansas
National Register of Historic Places in Fayetteville, Arkansas
1847 establishments in Arkansas
Odd Fellows cemeteries in the United States
Cemeteries established in the 1840s